Egyptian hip hop is a form of hip hop music in Egypt that draws inspiration from both regional and global events.

History 
Hip-Hop music reached Egypt when Andrew A. El-Sayid (OsamaBinRappin), a rapper from West Covina, California took Dr. Dre's "Nuthin' but a 'G' Thang" ft. Snoop Dogg cassette single, and DJ Jazzy Jeff & The Fresh Prince's "Boom! Shake the Room" red cassette single to Egypt on July 25th 1993. During his visit to Egypt he would play the music for his cousins, and would take the two cassettes on tour throughout his 1 month vacation, to cities such as Alexandria (Agami Beach) and would eventually leave it accidentally with the DJ at 'Disco 54' a club downstairs at the hotel he stayed at in Marsa Matruh. 

On August 26th, while taking a taxi to Cairo Airport with his father and brother, the country of Egypt heard hip hop for the first time on its radio airwaves. The song played was "Boom! Shake the Room"

Trap music 
Since rap and hip hop began to seep into Egypt's urban environment, it has stayed relatively underground. However, in the past few years, the trap scene began to emerge more and more into the spotlight, pushed by a handful of passionate artists like Abyusif, Wegz, Marwan Moussa, and of course Marwan Pablo. The Egyptian scene continues to bloom, widely influenced by the dark and gripping trap sound that is gaining a foothold in the wider Middle Eastern scene.

A new generation of rappers have taken over and trap music has now become the country’s second most streamed genres after Mahraganat, with a slew of artists emerging on the scene every year. Egyptian rappers often mix local genres and instruments with trap, creating their own unique variation of the genre.

See also
 Mahraganat
 African hip hop
 Arabic hip hop

References

 Loza, Pierre. "Hip hop on the Nile". Al-Ahram Weekly
 "Arab Hip-Hop & Rap News".Arabrap.org News

Hip hop
Hip hop by country
African hip hop